The Aguascalientes Open is a tennis tournament held in Aguascalientes, Mexico since 2011. The event is part of the ATP Challenger Tour and is played on outdoor clay courts.

Past finals

Singles

Doubles

References

External links

ATP Challenger Tour
Tennis tournaments in Mexico
Clay court tennis tournaments